The Puerto Rican flycatcher (Myiarchus antillarum) is a tyrant flycatcher endemic to the Puerto Rican archipelago and one of the 22 species belonging to the genus Myiarchus of the family Tyrannidae.

See also 

 Fauna of Puerto Rico
 List of birds of Puerto Rico
 List of endemic fauna of Puerto Rico
 List of Puerto Rican birds
 List of Vieques birds
 El Toro Wilderness

References

Puerto Rican flycatcher
Endemic birds of Puerto Rico
Puerto Rican flycatcher
Puerto Rican flycatcher